Vyacheslav Gennadyevich Kuznetsov (born 24 June 1989 in Togliatti) is a Russian former professional cyclist, who rode professionally between 2013 and 2021 for the  and  teams.

In 2010, he won La Côte Picarde, one of the events of the Nations Cup U23. He was named in the start list for the 2016 Giro d'Italia. In August 2019, he was named in the startlist for the 2019 Vuelta a España.

Major results

2008
 8th Grand Prix of Moscow
2010
 1st La Côte Picarde
 5th Duo Normand (with Anton Vorobyev)
 6th Textielprijs
 10th Road race, UCI Under-23 Road World Championships
 10th Trofeo Banca Popolare di Vicenza
2011
 1st  Road race, National Under-23 Road Championships
 2nd Coppa della Pace
 4th Overall Vuelta a la Comunidad de Madrid Under-23
 5th Overall Tour of Yeroskipos
 6th Omloop van het Waasland
 9th Grand Prix de la Ville de Lillers
2012
 1st La Roue Tourangelle
 2nd Overall Ronde de l'Oise
1st  Young rider classification
1st Stage 1
 2nd Central European Tour Košice–Miskolc
 2nd Ruota d'Oro
 3rd Overall Circuit des Ardennes
1st Stage 3 (TTT)
 3rd Mayor Cup
 3rd Grand Prix des Marbriers
 4th Overall Tour of Bulgaria
1st Stage 7
 6th Overall Olympia's Tour
 10th Duo Normand (with Pavel Kochetkov)
2014
 7th Overall Tour de Wallonie
2015
 4th Road race, National Road Championships
 8th Overall Tour of Belgium
2016
 3rd Overall Tour de Wallonie
 3rd Gent–Wevelgem
 9th Overall Tour of Qatar
2018
 7th Overall Tour de Wallonie
 7th Grand Prix Pino Cerami
2020
 7th Paris–Camembert
 10th Trofeo Felanitx-Ses Salines-Campos-Porreres

Grand Tour general classification results timeline

References

External links
Team Katusha profile

1989 births
Living people
Russian male cyclists
Sportspeople from Tolyatti